Ro or Rho is a small Greek island in the eastern Mediterranean Sea, more precisely in the Levantine Sea,  near Kastellorizo, close to the Turkish coast. It is part of the municipality of Megísti (Kastellorizo) in the South Aegean region.

Description
Together with other islets in the surrounding region, Ro was the object of a sovereignty dispute in the 1920s between Turkey and Italy, which at the time was in possession of Kastellorizo and the Dodecanese islands. The dispute was solved in a 1932 treaty, which assigned Ro to the Kingdom of Italy. It came under Greek sovereignty in 1947, together with the other former Italian possessions in the Aegean.

The islet is named Kara Ada ("black island") in Turkish.

History
Anciently, the island was known as Rhoge. An inhabitant of the island was called Rogaeus.
Ancient fortifications show that during the Hellenistic period and later, there was a small garrison post on the island.
The three towers of Kastellorizo, Ro and Strongyli comprise the main links in a dense network of watchtowers constructed by the citizens of Rhodes during the Hellenistic period, to control the sea routes and the coast.

Ro has been uninhabited for most of its modern history, except for the one Greek woman, with her husband and her mother, who made it famous, Despina Achladioti. Every day, Achladioti, also known as the Lady of Ro, raised a Greek flag over the island, until her death in 1982.

A Greek border outpost is based on the island, with the primary duty of continuing the tradition of raising the flag. According to the 2011 census the island has no permanent residents.

On April 10, 2018, Greek soldiers fired warning shots at a Turkish helicopter approaching the island. The helicopter was flying at a very low altitude late at night with its navigation lights switched off.

See also
List of islands of Greece
Italian Islands of the Aegean

References 

 Kalliopi Bairami, "Ro" in: Andreas Vlachopoulos (ed.), Archaiologia: Nisia tou Aigaiou, Melissa 2005, p. 375.

External links
Official website of Municipality of Megisti 

Kastellorizo